Brooklyn Preparatory School, commonly referred to as Brooklyn Prep, was a highly selective Jesuit preparatory school founded by the Society of Jesus in 1908. The school educated generations of young men from throughout New York City and Long Island until its closure in 1972.

The Prep was located on 1150 Carroll Street in the Crown Heights section of Brooklyn, New York. The grounds and buildings are presently part of Medgar Evers College of the City University of New York (CUNY). Located next to the Prep was the Church of St. Ignatius Loyola, which was also run by the Jesuits and which was closed in 2011.

As a Jesuit institution, Brooklyn Prep was noted for its religious values, classical roots (e.g., Latin and Greek), and dress code (ties and jackets) – all part of its goal of turning out well-rounded, educated men. Most of its graduates matriculated to four-year colleges. For many years, the school offered a full,$1,800. four-year scholarship, to the winner of its annual "Diocesan Spelling Bee", which was open to all eighth grade male students from the Diocese of Brooklyn as well as the Diocese of Rockville Center. In 1961, the more than 150 entrants dwindled down to the Spelling Bee winner... Arthur Reilly, from St. Pascal Baylon School, in Saint Albans, New York. 
The "Prep" was part of a group of eight Jesuit secondary schools in New York and New Jersey (Regis, Xavier, Loyola, Fordham Prep, St. Peter's Prep, Canisius and McQuaid).

The 100th anniversary of the school was celebrated by alumni and former faculty in October 2008.

In 2003, New York Nativity began "Brooklyn Jesuit Prep", a co-educational middle school in the former St. Teresa's School at Sterling Place and Classon Avenue in Crown Heights, providing Jesuit-taught tuition-free education for 5th through 8th grades.

Notable alumni
Among Brooklyn Prep's notable alumni are:
Robert S. Bennett, 1957 – Washington, D.C. attorney
William Peter Blatty, 1945 – author of The Exorcist
Joseph Califano, 1948 – former Secretary of Health, Education and Welfare
William P. Ford, 1953 [deceased] – international civil rights attorney*
Jack Hofsiss, 1967 – director of The Elephant Man
Joseph M. McLaughlin, 1950 – Senior Appellate Judge, Second Circuit
John Musto, 1972 – composer, concert pianist; 1997 Pulitzer Prize in Music finalist
Joe Paterno, 1944 [deceased] – football coach at Penn State for 45 years
John Sexton, 1959 – President of New York University
Dr. George A. Sheehan, 1936 (deceased) – best-selling running and fitness expert
Raymond Siller, 1956 – television writer, political consultant

Notable faculty
Noted faculty included:
Rev. Thomas V. Bermingham, SJ – classical scholar; professor at Georgetown University and Fordham University who worked on The Exorcist
Rev. Daniel Berrigan, SJ – peace activist; author and poet
Rev. Edward B. Bunn – dean of Brooklyn Prep and later president of Loyola University Maryland and Georgetown University
Rev. J. Charles Davey, SJ – first dean of Brooklyn Prep and president of Saint Joseph's University
John C. Lawn – varsity basketball coach, who became Drug Enforcement Administration Administrator, COO of the New York Yankees, and CEO of The Century Council

References

1908 establishments in New York City
1972 disestablishments in New York (state)
Defunct boys' schools in the United States
Defunct high schools in Brooklyn
Defunct Catholic secondary schools in New York City
Educational institutions disestablished in 1972
Educational institutions established in 1908
Jesuit high schools in the United States
Preparatory schools in New York City
Catholic preparatory schools in the United States
Boys' schools in New York City
Roman Catholic high schools in Brooklyn
Crown Heights, Brooklyn